MGY or a variant thereof is used as an abbreviation for:
Megagray (MGy) and milligray (mGy), SI derived units of the gray (absorbed radiation dose)
mgy, MGY, mmgy, MMgy, or MMGY: Million gallons per year

MGY as an identifier has been used to denote:
Dayton-Wright Brothers Airport, IATA code
Montgomeryshire, historic county in Wales, Chapman code
The maritime call sign of RMS Titanics radiotelegraph stationMGY' may also refer to:
MG Y-type, an MG car